Akhundov may refer to:
Mirza Fatali Akhundov, writer
 Punik, Armenia - formerly named Akhundov
 Rashadat Akhundov, activist
 Suleyman Sani Akhundov, journalist, author and teacher
 Vali Akhundov, politician and scientist
 Ruhulla Akhundov, politician
 Arif Akhundov, sprinter